Derekh Eretz is a centre-right political party in Israel. It was formed in March 2020 by Zvi Hauser and Yoaz Hendel after they left Telem.

History

On 2 March 2020, elections were held for the Twenty-third Knesset, in which Zvi Hauser and Yoaz Hendel ran for the Knesset as a part of the Telem Party and the larger Blue and White alliance. In the election, the alliance received 1,220,381 votes and 33 seats in the Knesset, making them the second largest parliamentary group behind the right-wing Likud Party. Although they came in second, Blue and White, and their leader, Benny Gantz, received the recommendations of a majority of Knesset members to form a government. However, many in the alliance, including Hauser and Hendel, feared the formation of a minority government with the support of the Joint List.

After receiving the recommendations, President Reuven Rivlin formally gave Gantz a mandate to form a government. To that end, Gantz began negotiations to form a unity government with incumbent Prime Minister Benjamin Netanyahu and his Likud Party. In response to this development, Yesh Atid, a centrist party in Blue and White led by Yair Lapid, and Ya'alon's Telem Party, applied to split their factions from Blue and White. Hauser and Hendel, who supported the alliance's entry into a unity government, applied to split themselves from the Telem Party. On 29 March 2020, the House Committee approved the division of Hauser and Hendel from Telem, and the formation of their own faction—Derekh Eretz.

On 8 December, both Hauser and Hendel announced they would join Gideon Sa'ar's recently formed New Hope. Neither were included when an alliance between Blue and White and New Hope was announced and they went on to join forces with Yamina in an alliance called Zionist Spirit that was announced on 27 July 2022. The alliance was ended in early September, when the two parties split up. Hendel and Hauser announced on 13 September that the party would not run in the 2022 election.

Leaders

Knesset members

Election results

References

Political parties in Israel
Political parties established in 2020
2020 establishments in Israel
Liberal parties in Israel
Zionist political parties in Israel